Marie-Anne Desmarest (May 17, 1904 – March 4, 1973) was a French writer.

She was born Anne-Marie During in Mulhouse. She was married twice: first to Henri Desmarest and later to Roger Leroy. Desmarest wrote romance novels. She died in Issy-les-Moulineaux at the age of 68.

Selected works 
 La Passion de Jeanne Rieber (1935), received the Prix de l'Alsace littéraire
 Torrents (1938), received the Prix Max Barthou de l'Académie française
 L'Autel renversé (1941)
 Aurore (1952)
 Les remparts de Saint-Paul (1959(
 A la recherche de l'amour (1960)
 L'Appel mystérieux (1968)

References 

1904 births
1973 deaths
Writers from Mulhouse
20th-century French novelists
20th-century French women writers